Vid Hidvégi (born 23 August 1986) is a Hungarian artistic gymnast and pommel horse specialist. A student of the Eszterházy Károly College, he finished runner-up at the 2007 Summer Universiade.

Hidvégi finished fifth at the 2012 Gymnastics Olympic Test Event and qualified for the 2012 Summer Olympics held in London. At the Olympics he went to the pommel horse final with the third best result. In the final, however, Hidvégi made a mistake and fell off the horse, thus got only 14.300 points and finished eighth.

Awards
Junior Prima Award (2012)

References

1986 births
Living people
Hungarian male artistic gymnasts
Gymnasts from Budapest
Gymnasts at the 2012 Summer Olympics
Gymnasts at the 2016 Summer Olympics
Olympic gymnasts of Hungary
Universiade medalists in gymnastics
Universiade silver medalists for Hungary
21st-century Hungarian people